Freeman Spur is a village in Williamson and Franklin Counties, Illinois, United States. The population was 287 at the 2010 census.

History

Freeman Spur is rooted in several small communities that sprang up in the early 1900s with the opening of the Possum Ridge coal mine.  These small communities voted to merge and incorporate as "Freeman Spur" in 1913.  The village is named for James R. Freeman, who owned the land upon which the mine was located.

Geography

The shaft of the Possum Ridge Mine, which opened in 1908, is located at Freeman Spur. In 1912, a tornado destroyed above-ground structures at the mine.

Demographics

At the 2000 census there were 273 people in 110 households, including 76 families, in the village. The racial makeup of the village was 91.21% White, 4.76% African American, 0.37% Native American, and 3.66% from two or more races. Hispanic or Latino of any race were 2.56%.

Of the 110 households 32.7% had children under the age of 18 living with them, 48.2% were married couples living together, 13.6% had a female householder with no husband present, and 30.9% were non-families. 27.3% of households were one person and 17.3% were one person aged 65 or older.  The average household size was 2.48 and the average family size was 2.97.

The age distribution was 26.4% under the age of 18, 9.2% from 18 to 24, 27.1% from 25 to 44, 23.1% from 45 to 64, and 14.3% 65 or older.  The median age was 36 years. For every 100 females, there were 97.8 males.  For every 100 females age 18 and over, there were 91.4 males.

The median household income was $24,219 and the median family income was $28,750. Males had a median income of $26,250 versus $23,750 for females. The per capita income for the village was $11,416.  About 15.5% of families and 22.1% of the population were below the poverty line, including 34.5% of those under the age of eighteen and 8.6% of those sixty five or over.

References

Villages in Franklin County, Illinois
Villages in Williamson County, Illinois
Villages in Illinois
Populated places in Southern Illinois